Machatas may refer to: 

Machatas of Elimeia an upper Macedonian prince early 4th century BC
Machatas of Europos an upper Macedonian proxenos of Delphians late 4th century BC
Machatas (sculptor) from Acarnania
Machatas of Aetolia ambassador 3rd century BC
Machatas father of Charops of Epirus 2nd century BC

See also
Machata